The Jackson State–Southern football rivalry, often informally called the BoomBox Classic, is a college football rivalry between the Tigers of Jackson State University (JSU) and the Jaguars of Southern University (SU). An annual conference game between two historically black universities in the Southwestern Athletic Conference (SWAC), its location usually rotates between JSU's Mississippi Veterans Memorial Stadium in Jackson, Mississippi and SU's A. W. Mumford Stadium in Baton Rouge, Louisiana, but it has also been held at larger venues to accommodate the crowds that the game draws. As of 2022, the Jaguars lead the series 35–32, not including two wins that Southern was ordered to vacate by the National Collegiate Athletic Association (NCAA).

Background
The teams first met on November 30, 1929, a 98–0 win by Southern. After that game, the series was not resumed again until 1958, when Jackson State joined the SWAC. Since then, the conference rivals have played each other every year—and twice in 1999 and 2013, when Southern defeated Jackson State in SWAC championship games. In fact, both schools are among the most successful SWAC members. Through 2021, Southern has won the second-most SWAC football titles (19), while Jackson State has won the third-most (17).

Past venues and atmosphere
Both JSU and SU are known to have finished among the top ten NCAA Division I Football Championship Subdivision schools in past annual home attendance figures. Due to the game's substantial crowds, it has sometimes been played at alternative venues to accommodate the numbers. In 1961 it was played in Mobile, Alabama as part of the second annual "Claver Classic." It was played in Baton Rouge's Memorial Stadium in 1978, since it could hold upwards of 25,000 fans, while Southern's stadium could only hold 13,000 at the time. It was played in New Orleans in 2000, 2002, and 2004—the latter as part of the then-annual "Big Easy Classic" series. In 2009, Southern voluntarily surrendered a home game to keep it at JSU’s home stadium to take advantage of the larger capacity. The 2012 game was played as part of the annual "W. C. Gorden Classic" series.

The intense rivalry extends beyond the game itself, featuring a battle between the schools' well-respected and popular marching bands, Jackson State's "Sonic Boom of the South" and Southern's "Human Jukebox." Hence, in the past, the game had been commonly referred to informally by using a portmanteau of the bands' names—the BoomBox Classic. The BoomBox battle traditionally starts about an hour before the game begins and continues for about an hour after the game has been decided, known as the "Zero Quarter" and "Fifth Quarter" respectively in the HBCU community.

Recent national attention
JSU's hiring of Deion Sanders as head coach in 2020 has drawn a great deal of attention to the Tiger program in general and the JSU-SU series in particular. On October 23, 2022, ESPN's College GameDay program announced that it would broadcast live from Mississippi Veterans Memorial Stadium on the morning of the game. GameDay has previously made appearances at only three other HBCU games: the 2005 Grambling State–Southern game at the Bayou Classic in Houston, the 2008 Florida A&M–Hampton game in Tallahassee, Florida, and the 2021 Alcorn State–North Carolina Central game at the MEAC/SWAC Challenge in Atlanta.

Game results

See also  
 List of NCAA college football rivalry games
 List of black college football classics

References

College football rivalries in the United States
Jackson State Tigers football
Southern Jaguars football
Black college football classics